The Rally 1000 Miglia (English: Rally 1000 Miles) is an Italian Rally that has been held since 1977, and is part of the European Rally Championship and the Italian Rally Championship.

Winners

References

External links 
 

1000
Sport in Lombardy
Thousand Miglia